{{Infobox concert tour
| concert_tour_name = Hannah Montana: Live In London
| image =
| caption =
| artist = Miley Cyrus
| album =Hannah MontanaHannah Montana 2
| start_date = March 28, 2007
| running time 30 minutes
| number_of_shows = 1
| Misc =

}}

Hannah Montana: Live In London was a concert held at the Koko Club on March 28, 2007 in London, England featuring Miley Cyrus as her fictional alter-ego, Hannah Montana. She performed songs from the Hannah Montana and Hannah Montana 2'' albums and also answered some questions from fans in the audience. It aired on Disney Channel on July 16, 2007.

Setlist 
"Life's What You Make It"
"Nobody's Perfect"
"Make Some Noise"
"Pumpin' Up the Party"
"The Best of Both Worlds"

International release 
 Italy: Disney Channel (Italy); July 18, 2007
 Latin America: Disney Channel Latin America; September 22, 2007
 Pakistan: Disney Channel Middle East; December 2007
 India: Disney Channel India; January 1, 2008

References 

Hannah Montana
Concerts in the United Kingdom